The Zangezur corridor is a concept for a transport corridor which, if implemented, would give Azerbaijan unimpeded access to Nakhchivan Autonomous Republic without Armenian checkpoints via Armenia's Syunik Province and, in a broad sense, for the geopolitical corridor that would connect Turkey to the rest of the Turkic world thereby "uniting it". The concept has been increasingly promoted by Azerbaijan and Turkey since the end of the Second Nagorno-Karabakh War, while Armenia has steadily objected to it, asserting that "corridor logic" deviates from the ceasefire statement trilaterally signed at the end of that war, and that it is a form of propaganda.

The terminology, the potential routes, and the modes of transport connections have since been points of contention between Azerbaijan and Armenia, which are still maintaining a mutual blockade since 1989. Azerbaijan has initiated construction projects on its territory presenting them as part of the implementation of a so-called "Zangezur corridor" and threatened that should Armenia not want it, Azerbaijan "will decide it by force".

During 2021 trilateral talks, Armenia expressed willingness to participate in rebuilding the Soviet-era railway links historically connecting Azerbaijan and Nakhichevan, which Azerbaijan interpreted as Armenian consent to the "Zangezur corridor". According to Russia, the third party, what is being discussed is unblocking regional communications, and not creating a "corridor".

Various observers have commented on the "Zangezur corridor", analysing the political implications of the term's usage, and the effects of it if implemented, some characterising the concept as a pan-Turkist agenda, drawing from irredentism, and others emphasising the solution to the blockade as a key aspect.

Historical context

Collapse of the Russian empire 

Zangezur was the name of a district created by the Russian Empire in 1868 as part of the Yelizavetpol governorate, covering an area including what is today the southern part of Armenia. Syunik, the Armenian name, is an older term dating back to antiquity (see also; Syunik (historical province)). The area of Syunik/Zangezur was disputed between the first republics of Armenia and Azerbaijan between 1918 and 1920, following the collapse of the Russian empire. In January 1919, Britain approved Azerbaijani jurisdiction over the territory but Armenian resistance outlasted military pressure until both republics were integrated into the Soviet Union.

Soviet period and Nagorno-Karabakh conflict

In Soviet times, two railway connections used to link Nakhichevan ASSR with the main territory of Azerbaijan SSR. The shorter line that passed via Syunik region (the southernmost Armenian province), was built earlier, in 1941, whereas the Yerevan-Ijevan-Qazax line further to the North, was constructed in the 1980s as an alternative route, connecting Yerevan to Baku and Russia. Both lines were abandoned since 1992 due to the Nagorno-Karabakh conflict.

Since 1989, Azerbaijan has blocked shipments of materials to both Armenia and Karabakh, countered by Armenia's blockade of Nakhichevan. Nakhchivan has suffered significantly from the economic blockade by Armenia as did the landlocked Armenia suffer from an economic blockade imposed by Azerbaijan and its ally Turkey. Air and land connections between Azerbaijan and Nakhchivan Autonomous Republic have had to be made through Turkish or Iranian territory.

In 1992 Turkey advocated the "double-corridor concept" firstly introduced by Paul A. Goble, which proposed territorial swap between Armenia and Azerbaijan.  According to the proposal Azerbaijan would relinquish Nagorno-Karabakh, which would be linked to Armenia. In exchange, Armenia would hand up the southern Zangezur corridor to Azerbaijan, connecting Nakhichevan to Azerbaijan.

In 2001 and 2002, Azerbaijan and Armenia discussed an agreement on a "land swap" peace proposal in which Azerbaijan would cede sovereignty over Nagorno-Karabakh (including the Lachin corridor, which linked southern Armenia to Artsakh, and was de facto under the control of the Artsakh Defence Army but de jure in Azerbaijan at that point) to Armenia in exchange for Armenia ceding sovereignty over the Meghri corridor to Azerbaijan. However, the resistance in both states was strong against the territorial swap, and so the plan did not work.

2020 ceasefire agreement
Re-establishment of transport connections was envisaged by article 9 of the ceasefire agreement signed on November 9, 2020 at the end of Second Nagorno-Karabakh War which stated:
All economic and transport connections in the region shall be unblocked. The Republic of Armenia shall guarantee the security of transport connections between the western regions of the Republic of Azerbaijan and the Nakhchivan Autonomous Republic in order to arrange unobstructed movement of persons, vehicles and cargo in both directions. The Border Guard Service of the Russian Federal Security Service shall be responsible for overseeing the transport connections.

In December 2020, Russia signalled its desire to connect Nakhichevan to the rest of Azerbaijan through a railway link that would go through Armenia. Azerbaijan, Armenia and Russia created a trilateral working group in order to unblock communications in the region. Russian foreign minister Sergei Lavrov said that the activity of this group will serve the implementation of confidence-building measures and resolution of humanitarian problems, and that the interests of Turkey and Iran are taken into account during trilateral consultations.

On 31 December 2020 Azerbaijan's president Ilham Aliyev announced plans to build a railroad line from Horadiz to Zangilan, from where it would use trucks to move goods to Nakhchivan and Turkey, suggesting a potential future transport link between Zangilan and Nakhchivan through Syunik. According to Aliyev, the "corridor" could eventually become a part of the International North–South Transport Corridor, connecting Iran to Russia via Azerbaijan and Armenia, while Armenia would get a railway link to Russia, Iran and potentially to Turkey.

On 14 January 2022, Prime Minister Nikol Pashinyan set up a working group for reconstruction of the Yeraskh to Nakhichevan border and Meghri sections of the Armenian railways. Adviser to the Prime Minister Artashes Tumanyan was appointed the head of the working group.

Usage of the term

2021 "corridor" dispute
In January 2021 trilateral meeting of Russian, Azerbaijani and Armenian leaders, Russian President Vladimir Putin emphasized the issue of opening economic, commercial and transportation links and borders, announcing that a joint working group under the chairmanship of the deputy prime ministers of these countries is formed to work on it.

In February 2021, a dispute arose around a clause in the 2020 Nagorno-Karabakh ceasefire agreement that provided for unblocking all economic and transport connections in the region, including that between the western regions of Azerbaijan and the Nakhchivan Autonomous Republic. Azerbaijani President Ilham Aliyev declared that the ceasefire agreement contained a special provision on the establishment of a so-called "Nakhichevan corridor". The Armenian government and Armenian opposition parties  rejected this claim emphasizing that the ceasefire agreement did not contain any provisions for establishing such "corridor".

In April 2021, Aliyev announced that Azerbaijani people would return to what he described as "West Zangazur" and Azerbaijan's "historic lands" within the borders of Armenia, but that Azerbaijan does not have territorial claims to any foreign country.

However, a week later, he warned that Azerbaijan would establish the "Zangezur corridor" by force if Armenia would not accede to the creation of the corridor. The Armenian foreign ministry responded that the country would "take all necessary measures to defend its sovereignty and territorial integrity." In May 2021, Armenian Prime Minister Nikol Pashinyan said that while Armenia is not willing to discuss 'corridor logic', it is keen on opening transport links as means of direct railway communication with Iran and Russia. The dispute has been cited as one of the reasons for the 2021 Armenia–Azerbaijan border crisis.

A new round of trilateral talks began on 20 October 2021. A day earlier, Armenian Deputy Prime Minister Mher Grigoryan said that progress was made toward the railway connections dating from the Soviet period being restored. A day after the talks had begun, Aliyev was quoted as saying that the Armenian side has agreed to the "Zangezur corridor".

On 9 November 2021, the Deputy Prime Minister of Russia and the co-chair of the trilateral task force dealing with cross-border connections Alexei Overchuk said that "Armenia and Azerbaijan will retain sovereignty over roads passing through their territory". The Russian Foreign Ministry confirmed this, commenting on the media speculation about the "so-called Zangezur corridor". The chairman of Azerbaijan's Center of Analysis of International Relations Farid Shafiyev said that if Armenia does not want to say "corridor", then an alternative term can be used, but insisted that unimpeded access for unimpeded movement to Nakhchivan must be given without any Armenian checkpoints, with the security of transport links provided only by the Russian border guards. According to Anar Valiyev, the dean of the Azerbaijan Diplomatic Academy, “What Azerbaijan wants is no checkpoints, not to have to stop at the border . . . We are in a situation where we have leverage, we have time and we can dictate terms.” 

On 15 December 2021, in Brussels, during a press conference with NATO Secretary General Jens Stoltenberg, Aliyev expressed a view that the "Zangezur corridor" should function as the Lachin corridor. During this, he said that the opening of the Zangezur corridor "is provisioned in the 10 November 2020 ceasefire agreement", adding that just as Azerbaijan assures security and entry to Lachin corridor, Armenia should provide the same unhampered entrance to the Zangezur corridor, without customs enforcement, and threatening that "if Armenia insists on customs points to control the movement of goods and people over the Zangezur Corridor, then [Azerbaijan] will insist on the same conditions in the Lachin corridor". In response to this, Pashinyan said that "Azerbaijan is trying to take the process of unblocking the regional connections to a deadlock" and that "the parallels made to the Lachin corridor do not have even the slightest connection to discussions and announcements signed to this date, and are unacceptable to Armenia".

On 10 January 2023, in reference to the arguments that the term "Zangezur corridor" does not exist in the 2020 November 9 tripartite agreement, Aliyev said: “Yes, I added that term to the geopolitical vocabulary later. However, it is clearly written there that a transport connection should be established between the western regions of Azerbaijan and the autonomous republic of Nakhichevan, and Armenia should provide it.”

Reportedly related construction projects 
During 2021, Azerbaijan has been building roads and a railway section in the areas it regained control over after the war; its officials have said that these construction projects have been undertaken in connection to the "Zangezur corridor".

Analyses

As a pan-Turkist agenda 
 
When hosting Erdogan in Zangelan on 27 October 2021, Aliyev said that "the corridor that is going to pass through here is going to unite the whole Turkic world". He repeated this during the meeting of the representatives of Organization of Turkic States on 12 November 2021, adding that the corridor will become for  Turkic states a link with Europe.

According to Iranian-born American political scientist Shireen Hunter, Turkey has been trying for a long time to establish a direct link to Azerbaijan by eliminating Iran's access to Armenia. Hunter explains that "Turkey has long wanted to have a land route to Azerbaijan and from there to northern Iran and Central Asia". She added: "if Turkey decides to push its long-held ambition of creating a direct link to the republic of Azerbaijan by eliminating Iran's access to Armenia, then the risk of escalation will increase".

Ahmad Kazemi, the author of the book Security in South Caucasus, told Iran's Strategic Council on Foreign Relations that "Azerbaijan is seeking to establish the so-called pan-Turkist illusionary Zangezur corridor in south of Armenia under the pretext of creating connectivity in the region", arguing that "this corridor is not compatible with any of the present geopolitical and historical realities of the region".

Since the end of the Second Nagorno-Karbakh War, Azerbaijan has increasingly promoted irredentist claims to Armenian territory which it describes as "Western Azerbaijan." In September 2022, pro-government media and certain Azerbaijani officials briefly promoted the irredentist concept of the “Goycha-Zangazur Republic” which claims all of southern Armenia. Azerbaijani member of parliament Hikmat Babaoghlu condemned the idea, arguing that it weakens Azerbaijan's public case to create the Zangezur corridor.

As a solution to the blockade 
Rather than building a transport route between Azerbaijan and its exclave Nakhchivan in isolation, Armenia has instead called for multiple routes to be opened simultaneously, that directly connect it to both Turkey and Azerbaijan, thereby ending the ongoing mutual blockade that has existed since 1989.

In the opinion of Thomas de Waal, a former journalist and a senior fellow with Carnegie Europe, "The economic benefits of the opening of closed transport routes in the South Caucasus, including as set out in the November 2020 ceasefire agreement between Armenia and Azerbaijan, could extend to all the countries of the region as well as to Russia, Turkey, and Iran. But the politics remains difficult within the region and between its neighbouring powers, with trust in short supply". According to de Waal, "Security concerns also haunt plans to reopen the crucial transport route across southern Armenia to and from Azerbaijan's exclave of Nakhchivan. Azerbaijan and Turkey are already connected by road through the Baku–Tbilisi–Kars railway across Georgia. A new route via southern Armenia would have the important result of de-isolating Nakhchivan and lifting its economy. Beyond that, this route would acquire more significance only if traffic across it is subjected to minimal checks and controls; Armenia for its part insists that it does not want a "corridor" across its territory over which it has no control, and it is supported in this stance by Iran". 

Michael Rubin, a senior scholar at the right-leaning think tank American Enterprise Institute (AEI), wrote that Turkey and Azerbaijan presidents are trying to redefine the clause on unblocking regional communications in trilateral ceasefire agreement by interpreting it as granting them a corridor bisecting sovereign Armenian territory and ignoring the first sentence in the clause about unblocking economic and transport connections across the region. Rubin called this reinterpretation unwarranted and illegitimate, arguing that the removing the double blockade of Armenia in order to reduce Armenian dependence upon Russia and Iran would be the best way forward from the situation. According to him, "while Turkey hopes its trucks could drive through Zangezur to Armenia, Armenian vehicles should likewise be able to drive from Yerevan to Istanbul. If Turks hope to enjoy unhampered trade with Central Asia all the way to the Chinese border, then Armenians in Artsakh should enjoy the same unhampered trade through Turkey all the way to France or the UK".

According to Stephen Blank, Senior Fellow at Foreign Policy Research Institute's Eurasia Program, the Zangezur Corridor stands out as the optimal way to bypass Russia's "blockade of global supply routes"; Armenia's acceptance would also re-affirm its commitment to partnership with the West.

International reaction 
  A joint statement by the European Parliament DSCA Chair Marina Kaljurand and Standing Rapporteurs on Armenia, Andrey Kovatchev, and Azerbaijan, Željana Zovko, among other things, condemned the statements made by the Azerbaijani side: "To de-escalate the situation, it is of utmost importance that inflammatory rhetoric ceases immediately. In this context, we condemn in particular recent statements by Azerbaijani representatives regarding so-called 'West Zangezur' and referring to the territory of the Republic of Armenia as Azerbaijani 'ancestral land'. Such statements are highly irresponsible and threaten to undermine regional security further." On 31 May 2022, Barend Leyts, the spokesperson for the European Council President Charles Michel wrote that "connectivity was specifically discussed in Brussels on 22 May to advance opportunities for unblocking the region. In this context, both parties confirmed there were no extraterritorial claims with regard to future transport infrastructure. Speculation to the contrary is regrettable." This statement came a week after Ilham Aliyev's statement about "Zangezur Corridor" where he made references to Charles Michel's announcement post trilateral meeting with Armenian and Azerbaijani presidents. 
  French Ambassador to Armenia Jonathan Lacôte objected to the use of "corridor" expression, because in his opinion the "corridors" have left a very bad memory in the history of diplomacy, such as the Polish Danzig Corridor, which was central to Nazi policy and served as a pretext to World War II.
  The Shusha Declaration signed by presidents of Azerbaijan and Turkey on 15 June 2021 included a passage on the "Zangezur corridor", and both Aliyev and Erdogan stressed the importance of its implementation in the following joint press conference. The Ministry of Foreign Affairs of Armenia condemned their joint visit to Shusha, calling it a provocation.
 Russian vice prime minister Overchuk attested in September 2021 that the trilateral group, which Russia is part of, discusses unblocking regional communications but not creating a "corridor".

Notes

References

Geopolitical corridors
Transport corridors
Armenia–Azerbaijan relations